Ang Iibigin ay Ikaw Pa Rin (International title: My One and Only Love 2 / ) is a 2003 Philippine television drama romance series broadcast by GMA Network. The series served as a sequel to the Philippine television series Ang Iibigin ay Ikaw. Directed by Joyce E. Bernal and Lore Reyes, it stars Christopher de Leon, Richard Gomez, Alice Dixson and Lani Mercado. It premiered on April 14, 2003 on the network's Telebabad line up replacing Ang Iibigin ay Ikaw. The series concluded on August 22, 2003 with a total of 93 episodes.

Cast and characters

Lead cast
 Christopher de Leon as Lemuel Verder
 Alice Dixson as Mia Sandoval
 Richard Gomez as Waldo Sandoval
 Lani Mercado as Madonna Verder

Supporting cast
 Barbara Perez as Salud Verder
 Boots Anson-Roa as Felisa Verder
 Mark Gil as Enrico Villadolid
 Jackie Lou Blanco as Sabrina Villadolid
 Cris Daluz as Antonio
 Rufa Mae Quinto as Liberty aka "Libay" 
 Anne Curtis as Rosanna
 Angel Locsin as Mariella Sandoval
 Karen delos Reyes as Elmina
 AJ Eigenmann
 Chubi del Rosario as Anthony
 Polo Ravales as Tristan
 Mely Tagasa as Miling
 Shermaine Santiago as Mayumi
 Tess Dumpit as Virginia
 Kathleen Valenzuela as Kathleen
 Raquel Montesa as young Salud
 Charina Scott as Jing jing
 Joy Viado as Anacleta
 Ama Quiambao as Lourdes

Guest cast
 Imee Marcos as Donato Verder's lawyer

References

External links
 

2003 Philippine television series debuts
2003 Philippine television series endings
Filipino-language television shows
GMA Network drama series
Philippine romance television series
Television shows set in the Philippines